Peter O'Hagan was an Irish Nationalist politician who sat as a Social Democratic and Labour Party (SDLP) Councillor on Lisburn City Council.  He was one of three SDLP members of the predominantly Unionist council.

O'Hagan represented the electoral ward of Killultagh, County Antrim.  In 1998, O'Hagan became the first nationalist Mayor of Lisburn. In 1996 he was an unsuccessful candidate in the Northern Ireland Forum election in Lagan Valley.

O'Hagan died on 23 December 2009.

References

Social Democratic and Labour Party politicians
Mayors of places in Northern Ireland
Members of Lisburn City Council
2009 deaths
Year of birth missing